Nemanja Đurović (Serbian Cyrillic: Немања Ђуровић; born 20 December 1986) is a Serbian-Bosnian professional footballer.

Career
He was playing in FK Slavija Sarajevo, when in summer 2007, he moved to Cyprus to play half season in Ethnikos Achna FC. In winter, he moved to Serbia where he played in the Serbian Superliga club FK Smederevo, until the end of the season. In the summer 2008, he moved to a Serbian First League (second level league) club FK Kolubara, and next winter, moved back to top league, this time to FK Napredak Kruševac. He can play in both right side positions, as midfielder or defender. His market value is estimated to be 200.000 Euros.

External links
 Profile at Prva liga Srbije
 Profile and stats at Srbijafudbal
 Napredak squad at FootballSquads

1986 births
Living people
Footballers from Belgrade
Serbian footballers
Serbian expatriate footballers
Serbian SuperLiga players
Cypriot First Division players
FK Slavija Sarajevo players
Ethnikos Achna FC players
FK Smederevo players
FK Kolubara players
FK Napredak Kruševac players
FK Banat Zrenjanin players
FK Teteks players
Expatriate footballers in Cyprus
Association football midfielders